Fritz Schnürle (23 February 1898 – 9 November 1937) was a German footballer who played as a forward and made one appearance for the Germany national team.

Career
Schnürle earned his first and only cap for Germany on 5 June 1921 in a friendly against Hungary. The away match, which took place in Budapest, finished as a 0–3 loss.

Personal life
Schnürle died on 9 November 1937 at the age of 39.

Career statistics

International

References

General references

External links
 
 
 
 
 

1898 births
1937 deaths
Sportspeople from Pforzheim
Footballers from Baden-Württemberg
German footballers
Germany international footballers
Association football forwards
1. FC Pforzheim players
SpVgg Greuther Fürth players
VfL Germania 1894 players
VfR Pforzheim players